Diogene Ochs (born August 21, 1987, in Windhoek, Namibia) better known as his stage name D-Jay, is a Namibian Hip Hop artist.

References

Living people
1987 births
Namibian hip hop musicians
Musicians from Windhoek